In November 2004, voters in the U.S. state of California passed Proposition 63, the Mental Health Services Act (MHSA), which has been designed to expand and transform California's county mental health service systems.  The MHSA is funded by imposing an additional one percent tax on individual, but not corporate, taxable income in excess of one million dollars. In becoming law in January 2005, the MHSA represents the latest in a Californian legislative movement, begun in the 1990s, to provide better coordinated and more comprehensive care to those with serious mental illness, particularly in underserved populations. Its claim of successes thus far, such as with the development of innovative and integrated Full Service Partnerships (FSPs), are not without detractors who highlight many problems but especially a lack of oversight, large amount of unspent funds, poor transparency, lack of engagement in some communities, and a lack of adherence to required reporting as challenges MHSA implementation must overcome to fulfill the law's widely touted potential.

Background

At one time, California was known for having a strong mental health system. Treatment was available for Medi-Cal recipients with few limitations on care.   Legislators and voters have acknowledged the inadequacy of California's historically underfunded mental health system to care for the state's residents, especially those with serious mental illness, over the past few decades. In 1991, to build a more community- and county-based system of care, the California legislature instituted realignment, a delegation of the control over mental health funds and care delivery from state to county. This was followed by a succession of legislation targeted towards marginalized populations with high documented rates of mental illness, such as the homeless (AB 2034, in 1999) and the potentially violent mentally ill (Laura's Law, in 2002).
However, with the passage of Proposition 63 in 2004, California voters acted upon a widespread perception that state and county mental health systems were still in disrepair, underfunded, and requiring a systematic, organizational overhaul. This perception echoed a nationwide perspective, with the President's New Freedom Commission on Mental Health in 2003 calling for fundamental transformation of the historically fragmented mental health system. The MHSA is California's attempt to lead the way in accomplishing such systemic reform.

In the end, voter consciences were pricked by the well-organized and -funded campaign that displayed both the need (50,000 mentally ill homeless people, according to the National Alliance on Mental Illness) and the promise (successes of past mental health initiatives) of increased funding for the mental health system. Then-Assemblyman Darrell Steinberg and Rusty Selix, executive director of the Mental Health Association in California, led the initiative by collecting at minimum 373,816 signatures, along with financial ($4.3 million) and vocal support from stakeholders.  Though Governor Arnold Schwarzenegger and the business community were opposed to Proposition 63 because of the tax it would impose on millionaires, the opposition raised only $17,500. On November 2, 2004, Proposition 63 passed with 53.8% of the vote, with 6,183,119 voting for and 5,330,052 voting against the bill.

Overview

The voter-approved MHSA initiative provides for developing, through an extensive stakeholder process, a comprehensive approach to providing community based mental health services and supports for California residents.  Approximately 51,000 taxpayers in California will be helping to fund the MHSA through an estimated $750 million in tax revenue during fiscal year 2005–06.

The MHSA was an unprecedented piece of legislation in California for several reasons:
 Its funding source, quantity, and allocation is dedicated for mental health services, including times of budget cuts to many other public programs
 It was intended to engage communities in prioritizing which service elements would be funded. 
 It was focused on developing preventive and innovative programs to help transform the mental health care system in California.

To accomplish its objectives, the MHSA applies a specific portion of its funds to each of six system-building components:
 Community program planning and administration (10%)
 Community services and supports (45%)
 Capital (buildings) and information technology (IT) (10%)
 Education and training (human resources) (10%)
 Prevention and early intervention (20%)
 Innovation (5%)

Notably, none of the funds were to be used for programs with  existing fund allocations, unless it was for a new element or expansion in those existing programs. At least 51% of the funds have to be spent on community services and support for children and adults with or at risk of developing mental illness.

The MHSA stipulates that the California State Department of Mental Health (DMH) will contract with county mental health departments (plus two cities) to develop and manage the implementation of its provisions.  Oversight responsibility for MHSA implementation was handed over to the sixteen member Mental Health Services Oversight and Accountability Commission (MHSOAC) on July 7, 2005, when the commission first met.

The MHSA specifies requirements for service delivery and supports for children, youths, adults and older adults with serious emotional disturbances and/or severe mental illnesses.  MHSA funding will be made annually to counties to:
 Define serious mental illness among children, adults and seniors as a condition deserving priority attention, including prevention and early intervention services and medical and supportive care
 Reduce the long-term adverse impact on individuals, families and State and local budgets resulting from untreated serious mental illness
 Expand the kinds of successful, innovative service programs for children, adults and seniors already established in California, including culturally and linguistically competent approaches for underserved population
 Provide State and local funds to adequately meet the needs of all children and adults who can be identified and enrolled in programs under this measure
 Ensure all funds are expended in the most cost-effective manner and services are provided in accordance with recommended best practices, subject to local and State oversight to ensure accountability to taxpayers and to the public

Implementation

Starting from enactment, implementation of the MHSA was intended to take six months; in reality, the process of obtaining stakeholder input for administrative rules extended this period by several months. By August 2005, 12 meetings and 13 conference calls involving stakeholders across the state resulted in the final draft of rules by which counties would submit their three-year plans for approval.

Counties are required to develop their own three-year plan, consistent with the requirements outlined in the act, in order to receive funding under the MHSA.  Counties are obliged to collaborate with citizens and stakeholders to develop plans that will accomplish desired results through the meaningful use of time and capabilities, including things such as employment, vocational training, education, and social and community activities.  Also required will be annual updates by the counties, along with a public review process.  County proposals will be evaluated for their contribution to achieving the following goals:
 Safe and adequate housing, including safe living environments, with family for children and youths
 Reduction in homelessness
 A network of supportive relationships
 Timely access to needed help, including times of crisis
 Reduction in incarceration in jails and juvenile halls
 Reduction in involuntary services, including reduction in institutionalization and out-of-home placements

MHSA specifies three stages of local funding, to fulfill initial plans, three year plans, and long-term strategies. No services would be funded in the first year of implementation. The DMH approved the first county plan in January 2006. Allocations for each category of funding were planned to be granted annually, based upon detailed plans with prior approval. However, an amendment to the MHSA, AB 100, which passed in March 2011, serves to streamline the DMH approval and feedback process to the counties, ostensibly to relieve the DMH of some of its administrative burden.

Roles & Responsibilities

While the county mental health departments are involved in the actual implementation of MHSA programs, the MHSA mandates that several entities support or oversee the counties. These include the State Department of Mental Health (DMH) and the Mental Health Services Oversight and Accountability Commission (MHSOAC).

California State Department of Mental Health (DMH)

In accordance with realignment, the DMH approves county three-year implementation plans, upon comment from the MHSOAC, and passes programmatic responsibilities to the counties. In the first few months immediately following its passage, the DMH has:
 Obtained federal approvals and Medi-Cal waivers, State authority, additional resources and technical assistance in areas related to implementation
 Established detailed requirements for the content of local three year expenditure plans
 Developed criteria and procedures for reporting of county and state performance outcomes
 Defined requirements for the maintenance of current State and local efforts to protect against supplanting existing programs and their funding streams
 Developed formulas for how funding will be divided or distributed among counties
 Determined how funding will flow to counties and set up the mechanics of distribution
 Established a 16-member Mental Health Services Oversight and Accountability Commission (MHSOAC), composed of elected State officials and Governor appointees, along with procedures for MHSOAC review of county planning efforts and oversight of DMH implementation
 Developed and published regulations and provide preliminary training to all counties on plan development and implementation requirements

The DMH has directed all counties to develop plans incorporating five essential concepts:
 Community collaboration
 Cultural competence
 Client/family-driven mental health system for older adults, adults and transition age youth and family-driven system of care for children and youth
 Wellness focus, which includes the concepts of recovery and resilience
 Integrated service experiences for clients and their families throughout their interactions with the mental health system

The DMH, in assuming and asserting its primacy over MHSA implementation, has dictated requirements for service delivery and supports as follows:
 Full Service Partnership (FSP) Funds - funds to provide necessary services and supports for initial populations
 General System Development Funds - funds to improve services and infrastructure
 Outreach and Engagement Funding - funds for those populations that are currently receiving little or no service

Mental Health Services Oversight and Accountability Commission (MHSOAC)

The authors of the MHSA created the MHSOAC to reflect the consumer-oriented focus of the law, mandating at least two appointees with severe mental illness, two other family members of individuals with severe mental illness, and various other community representatives. This diverse commission holds the responsibility of approving county implementation plans, helping develop mental illness stigma-relieving strategies, and recommending service delivery improvements to the state on an as-needed basis. Whenever the commission identifies a critical issue related to the performance of a county mental health program, it may refer the issue to the DMH.

The first meeting of the MHSOAC was held July 7, 2005, at which time Proposition 63 author Darrell Steinberg was selected unanimously by fellow commissioners as chairman, without comment or discussion.  After accepting the gavel, Steinberg was roundly praised for devising Proposition 63's 'creative financing' scheme.  Steinberg then said, "We must focus on the big picture," and stated his priorities with regard to the implementation of the MHSA:
 Prioritize prevention and early intervention, without falling into the trap of fail first service provision,
 Address "the plight of those at risk of falling off the edge," and to
 Advocate for mental health services from his "bully pulpit."

MHSOAC commissioners

In accordance with MHSA requirements, the Commission shall consist of 16 voting members as follows:

 The Attorney General or his or her designee
 The Superintendent of Public Instruction or his or her designee
 The Chairperson of the Senate Health and Human Services Committee or another member of the Senate selected by the President pro Tempore of the Senate
 The Chairperson of the Assembly Health Committee or another member of the Assembly selected by the Speaker of the Assembly
 Twelve appointees of the Governor, who shall seek individuals who have had personal or family experience with mental illness, to include:
 two persons with a severe mental illness
 a family member of an adult or senior with a severe mental illness
 a family member of a child who has or has had a severe mental illness
 a physician specializing in alcohol and drug treatment
 a mental health professional
 a county Sheriff,
 a Superintendent of a school district
 a representative of a labor organization
 a representative of an employer with less than 500 employees
 a representative of an employer with more than 500 employees
 a representative of a health care services plan or insurer

State government appointees

The initial government officials and designee appointed:

 Senator Wesley Chesbro (Democrat), of Arcata, chair of the Senate Budget and Fiscal Review Committee and the Senate Select Committee on Developmental Disabilities and Mental Health.
 Assemblyman Mark Ridley-Thomas (Dem), of Los Angeles, a member of the Assembly Health committee and former L.A. city councilman.
 Attorney General Bill Lockyer, of Hayward, a former State Senator and Assemblyman.
 Darrell Steinberg (Dem), of Sacramento, an attorney, the author of Proposition 63, former Assemblyman.  Steinberg is the appointee of the Superintendent of Public Instruction.

Governor's appointees

On June 21, 2005, Governor Schwarzenegger announced his appointment of twelve appointees to the MHSOAC:

 MHOAC Vice Chairman Linford Gayle (declined to state party), 46, of Pacifica, a mental health program specialist at San Mateo County Mental Health Services.
 Karen Henry (Republican), 61, of Granite Bay, a labor attorney and a board member of California National Alliance for the Mentally Ill (NAMI).  Henry is afflicted by 'rapid cycling' bipolar disorder, has a son who has autism, and another son with a mental illness.
 William Kolender (Rep), 70, of San Diego, the San Diego County Sheriff and president of the State Sheriffs Association, a member of the State Board of Corrections, and was for three years the director of the California Youth Authority (CYA).  Kolender's wife died as a result of mental illness, and he has a son with a mental disorder.
 Kelvin Lee, Ed.D. (Rep), 58, of Roseville, a superintendent of the Dry Creek Joint Elementary School District.
 Andrew Poat (Rep), 45, of San Diego, former director of the government relations department for the City of San Diego, a member of the public policy committee for the San Diego Gay and Lesbian Center, and a former deputy director of the United States Office of Consumer Affairs.  Poat represented employers of more than 500 workers on the commission, and says he will use his experience building multimillion-dollar programs to bring together mental health advocates.
 Darlene Prettyman (Rep), 71, of Bakersfield, is a psychiatric nurse, a board member and past president of NAMI California, and a past chairman and a member of the California Mental Health Planning Council.  Her son has schizophrenia, and her stated priority is to enhance provision of housing for mental health service clients.
 Carmen Diaz (Dem), 53, of Los Angeles, a family advocate coordinator with the L.A. County Department of Mental Health and a board member of United Advocates for Children of California.  Diaz has a family member with a severe mental illness.
 F. Jerome Doyle (Dem), 64, of Los Gatos, is chief executive officer of EMQ (a provider of mental health services for children and youth), a board member and past president of the California Council of Community Mental Health Agencies, and a board member of California Mental Health Advocates for Children.
 Saul Feldman DPA, (Dem), 75, of San Francisco, is chairman and CEO of United Behavioral Health, a member of the American Psychological Association, the founder and former president of the American College of Mental Health Administration, and a former president and CEO of Health America Corporation of California.  Feldman was appointed as a health care plan insurer.
 Gary Jaeger, M.D. (Dem), 62, of Harbor City, is currently the chief of addiction medicine at Kaiser Foundation Hospital, South Bay, a member and former chair of the Behavioral Health Advisory Board of the California Healthcare Association, and former medical director of family recovery services at St. Joseph Hospital in Eureka.  He says members of his family have an "80 percent rate of drug and alcohol abuse."
 Mary Hayashi (Dem), 38, of Castro Valley, president of the Iris Alliance Fund and a board member for Planned Parenthood Golden Gate and member of the Board of Registered Nursing.  Hayashi's concerns include transportation access for clients and paratransit services, and represents employers with 500 or fewer workers.
 Patrick Henning (Dem), 32, of West Sacramento, is the legislative advocate for the California Council of Laborers. He was previously the Assistant Secretary at the Labor and Workforce Development Agency (An Agency that he helped create), deputy director for the Department of Industrial Relations and Prior to his State service Special Advisor and Congressional Liaison to President Bill Clinton. Henning is a member of the Career Technical Education Standards and Framework Advisory Group and the California Assembly Speaker's Commission on Labor Education. He represents labor.

Current progress

One unqualified success story from the MHSA thus far involves the implementation of Full Service Partnerships (FSPs) demonstrating the "whatever it takes" commitment to assist in individualized recovery - whether it is housing, "integrated services, flexible funding [such as for childcare], intensive case management, [or] 24 h access to care." FSP interventions are based upon evidence from such programs as Assertive community treatment (ACT), which has effectively reduced homelessness and hospitalizations while bettering outcomes. But the FSP model looks more like that of the also-popular MHA Village in Long Beach, which is a center that offers more comprehensive services besides those specifically mental health-related. Beyond these guiding principles, however, there has not been much consensus over unifying strategies to define and implement an FSP - resulting in varying FSP structures across counties.

Overall, though, the Petris Center, funded by the DMH and California HealthCare Foundation to evaluate the MHSA, has reported quantifiable improvements in many areas:
 Homelessness rates
 Entry rates into the criminal justice system
 Suffering from illness
 Daily functioning
 Education rates
 Employment rates
 General satisfaction with FSPs

Continued challenges

According to the UCLA Center for Health Policy Research, the 2007 and 2009 California Health Interview Surveys (CHIS) demonstrate continued mental health needs of almost two million Californians, about half of which were unmet in 2011. In spite of steady tax revenue ($7.4 billion raised as of September 2011) earmarked for the MHSA, the unremittingly high numbers of mentally ill who lack treatment contrast starkly with the implementation of new programs like the FSPs, which may cost tens of thousands of dollars annually per person. The MHA Village program, for example, averages around $18,000 annually per person. One of the major growing concerns regarding MHSA implementation is its unintentional but worrying tendency to create silos of care. As directed by the DMH, counties search for "unserved" mentally ill or at-risk individuals to enroll in their new programs, while keeping existing and perhaps underserved clients in old programs that are usually underfunded, but cannot take MHSA funds. Ironically, while the MHSA was established in part to address racial/ethnic disparities in health care, it may be perpetuating the disparity in services delivery between underfunded and well-funded, new programs.

A possible solution to this issue highlights another challenge for the MHSA: the need for more comprehensive evaluation, oversight, and advisory mechanisms. Though there is an accountability commission, the MHSOAC, its oversight and regulatory responsibilities are not well-defined. However, it is a relatively new entity, having been created by the MHSA in 2004, and has yet to fully delineate its role in the MHSA. With time, the MHSOAC will hopefully continue to develop towards its stated function. Objective and expert evaluation of the MHSA will also be necessary to achieve the kind of longstanding system-wide improvement that then becomes a model for others.

See also
 Care in the Community
 Chemical imbalance theory
 History of mental illness
 Lanterman-Petris-Short Act
 MindFreedom International
 New Freedom Commission on Mental Health
 Outpatient commitment
 Psychiatric hospital
 Psychiatric survivors movement
 Texas Medication Algorithm Project
 The Village ISA (award-winning recovery program)
 Whitehall Study
Mental Health Association of San Francisco

References

External links

Government agencies
 CAIChildLaw.org - 'Sacramento County Funding Request for Mental Health Services Act Community Planning Program'
 www.dmh.ca.gov - 'Mental Health Services Act (MHSA): Home Page', California Department of Mental Health
 www.mhsoac.ca.gov -  	'Mental Health Services Act (MHSA): MHSOAC (Mental Health Oversight and Accountability Commission) Home Page', California Department of Mental Health
 Governor.ca.gov - 'Governor Schwarzenegger Appoints Twelve to the Mental Health Services Oversight and Accountability Commission', Office of the Governor Press Room (June 21, 2005)

Private Organizations
 CDCan.us - 'California Disability Community Action Network: Linking People to Disability Rights and Issues'

Media coverage
 CaliforniaHealthline.org - 'County Officials Work To Create Plans for Allocation of Proposition 63 Funds', California Healthcare Foundation (July 11, 2005)
 ContraCostaTimes.com - 'Mental health funding offers hope', Sara Steffens, ''Contra Costa Times (July 11, 2005)

Mental Health Services Act, California
Mental health law in the United States
2004 California ballot propositions